Łężyce may refer to the following places in Poland:
Łężyce, Lower Silesian Voivodeship (south-west Poland)
Łężyce, Świętokrzyskie Voivodeship (south-central Poland)
Łężyce, Pomeranian Voivodeship (north Poland)